Maksim Bоrtnik (born July 3, 1987, in Kharkiv), in the Ukrainian SSR of the Soviet Union (in present-day Ukraine).
In 2009 he graduated from the Kharkov State Academy of Culture.
From 2007 to 2008 - animation designer at Kharkov TV OTV.
Since 2008 television director of STB (Channel) in Kyiv.
In 2009, became principal director of historic program "У пошуках істини" ("In search of truth") STB (Channel).
In 2010 - head of  humorous TV show "Смешные люди" ( "Funny People") STB (Channel).Since  2011 -  Chief director of the Ukrainian TV show The Cube (analogue of the British show The Cube) STB (Channel).

Creative way

External links 
"In search of truth.Vera Kholodnaya.Last part. "
 https://web.archive.org/web/20110728102708/http://play.ukr.net/videos/show/key/4563fd36817e3cfa569e41d679b4b660/

"In search of truth. Mysteries of Easter "
 https://web.archive.org/web/20100409113336/http://play.ukr.net/videos/show/key/5640b4193b363962ea51c954849baec3

"In search of truth.Konstantin Rokossovsky`s Guardian Angel "
 https://web.archive.org/web/20110724121301/http://videocat.net/play-1A5-quotU_poshukax_istiniquot_YAngol_oxo.html

"In search of truth. The privacy of Adolf Hitler "
 https://web.archive.org/web/20101030235203/http://play.ukr.net/videos/show/key/35d60184fb2ff90466872b4c2fa70233/

"In search of truth. Caligula: Emperor morbid passion "
  http://www.stb.ua/ua/video/88322/

"Funny People"
  

1987 births
Living people
Ukrainian film directors